Reclaim Tuen Mun Park may refer to:

July 2019 Reclaim Tuen Mun Park, 6 July 2019 protest in Hong Kong
September 2019 Reclaim Tuen Mun Park, 21 September 2019 protest in Hong Kong

2019–2020 Hong Kong protests